Music @ Work is the seventh studio album by Canadian rock band The Tragically Hip. The album was leaked via the internet six weeks before its official release in June, 2000. It won the 2001 Juno Award for Best Rock Album.

Commercial performance
Music @ Work debuted at #1 on the Canadian Albums Chart, selling 45,396 copies in its first week. The album has been certified 2× Platinum in Canada.

Track listing 
All songs were written by The Tragically Hip.

The Tragically Hip
Gord Downie – lead vocals
Rob Baker – lead guitar
Paul Langlois – rhythm guitar
Gord Sinclair – bass guitar, backing vocals
Johnny Fay – drums

Year-end charts

References 

2000 albums
The Tragically Hip albums
Universal Music Canada albums
Juno Award for Rock Album of the Year albums